He's Watching, is a 2022 American found footage horror film written and directed by Jacob Aaron Estes, starring Iris Serena Estes and Lucas Steel Estes.

The film was released on July 21, 2022, and received positive reviews from critics.

Plot
A young boy is watched by his older selfSeptember 2022}}

Cast
 Iris Serena Estes as Iris Serena Estes
 Lucas Steel Estes as Lucas Steel Estes

Release
The film was released to video on demand on 21 July 2022.

Reception
On review aggregator website Rotten Tomatoes, the film holds an approval rating of 88% based on 8 reviews, with an average rating of 6.70/10.

Chad Collins of Dread Central rated the film 4 stars out of 5, writing "Hypnotic and unique, He’s Watching is a testament to the staying power of found footage". Emily von Seele of the Daily Dead rated the film 3.5 stars out of 5. The film received a positive review in ScreenAnarchy.

References

External links
 
 

American horror films
2022 horror films
Found footage films